Prolintane (Catovit, Katovit, Promotil, Villescon) is a stimulant and norepinephrine-dopamine reuptake inhibitor developed in the 1950s. It is the member of amphetamine and derivatives. It is closely related in chemical structure to other drugs such as pyrovalerone, MDPV, and propylhexedrine and it has a similar mechanism of action. Many cases of prolintane abuse have been reported.

Under the trade-name "Katovit", prolintane was commercialized by the Spanish pharmaceutical company, FHER. Katovit was sold until 2001, and was most often used by students and workers as a stimulant to provide energy, promote alertness and concentration.

See also 
 α-PVP (β-ketone-prolintane, prolintanone)
 Methylenedioxypyrovalerone (MDPV)
 Pyrovalerone (Centroton, Thymergix)
 Phenylpropylaminopentane

References 

Stimulants
Pyrrolidines
Norepinephrine–dopamine reuptake inhibitors
Phenethylamines